Scopula nostima is a moth of the  family Geometridae. It is found in Colombia.

References

Moths described in 1938
nostima
Moths of South America